is one of 9 wards of Kobe, Japan. It has an area of 28.46 km², and a population of 127,602 with 74,814 households as of January 31, 2012. The ward was formed from the 1980 merger of the former Fukiai-ku and Ikuta-ku.

The Consulate-General of Panama in Kobe is located on the eighth floor of the Moriyama Building in Chūō-ku. Also in the ward are the headquarters of Sumitomo Rubber Industries, Sysmex Corporation, a global medical devices manufacturing company and TOA Corporation, an electronics company.

Places of note
Port of Kobe
Port Island
Kobe Port Tower
Harborland
Kobe Airport

Education

International schools:
Kobe Chinese School, a Mainland China-oriented Chinese international school
Kobe Korean Elementary and Junior High School (神戸朝鮮初中級学校), a North Korea-oriented Korean international school

Gallery

References

External links

 

Wards of Kobe